Philippe Hamel (October 12, 1884 – January 22, 1954) was a nationalist and progressive politician in Quebec, Canada.

Background

He was born on October 12, 1884, in Quebec City. His father was Charles-Antoine-Auguste and his mother was Sophie Vallieres. His father was a doctor of medicine at Université Laval and his mothers occupation is unknown

Member of the legislature

Hamel entered politics with the intention to achieve the nationalization of all privately owned electric companies. He first won a seat to the Legislative Assembly of Quebec as an Action libérale nationale candidate in the 1935 election in the district of Québec-Centre.

When his party merged with the Conservative Party of Quebec to form the Union Nationale, Hamel became one of Maurice Duplessis's most important campaign leaders. He was returned to office in the 1936 election and the Union Nationale won the election.

Excluded from the Cabinet

After he secured his job as Premier, Duplessis kept many of the more progressive and independent-minded members of his party on the backbench. Therefore, Hamel was offered no portfolio. By 1937, he and colleagues René Chaloult, Oscar Drouin, Joseph-Ernest Grégoire and Adolphe Marcoux had left the Union Nationale.  Hamel did not run for re-election in the 1939 election.

Death

He died on January 22, 1954, at the age of 69 years old.

Legacy

Hamel's main objective did not take place while he was in office. However, the government of Adélard Godbout bought the Montreal Light Heat & Power Co., which became Hydro-Québec, in 1944. Furthermore, nearly all privately owned electric corporations were nationalized and merged to Hydro-Québec in 1962–63, under the premiership of Jean Lesage.

References

1884 births
1954 deaths
Action libérale nationale MNAs
Union Nationale (Quebec) MNAs